The 1994–95 Tecos UAG season is the 35th season in the football club's history and the 19th consecutive season in the top flight of Mexican football.

Summary
In summertime, President Jose Antonio Leaño managed to keep the core of players after won its first league included head coach Victor Vucetich (rumours about a contract-to-life with UAG) despite several and lucrative offers to transfer out players. However, Leaño Family did not reinforced the squad in a sign of austerity for upcoming seasons. Incumbent Champions Tecos UAG could not repeat its feature of last campaign and finish the league season on the 5th spot classifying for Championship Playoff only to be defeated by Necaxa and eliminated in quarterfinals.

Squad

Transfers

Winter

Competitions

La Liga

League table

Group 1

General table

Results by round

Matches

Repechaje

Quarterfinals

References

External links

1994–95 Mexican Primera División season
1994–95 in Mexican football